The 2014 Latvian Higher League was the 23rd season of top-tier football in Latvia. FK Ventspils are the defending champions. The season started on 21 March 2014. Initially, Skonto Riga and Daugava Daugavpils, the second and third teams from the previous season, were denied a license to participate and the league began with eight clubs. However, their appeals against this were successful and the league was restored to ten clubs.

Teams 
This year the league had ten participants.

Stadiums and locations

League table

Relegation play-offs
The 9th-placed side faced the runners-up of the 2014 Latvian First League in a two-legged play-off, with the winner being awarded a spot in the 2015 Higher League competition.

FS METTA/LU won 6–1 on aggregate.

Results

Season statistics

Top scorers

Player of the Month

Manager of the Month

References 

Latvian Higher League seasons
1
Latvia
Latvia